Dahlgren Township may refer to the following townships in the United States:

 Dahlgren Township, Hamilton County, Illinois
 Dahlgren Township, Carver County, Minnesota